Igor Viktorovich Fatin (born 24 November 1962) is a former Russian professional footballer.

Club career
He made his professional debut in the Soviet Second League in 1979 for FC Zvezda Irkutsk.

References

1962 births
Living people
Soviet footballers
Russian footballers
Association football midfielders
FC Zvezda Irkutsk players
FC Okean Nakhodka players
Russian Premier League players